The Chlorobi-1 RNA motif is a conserved RNA secondary structure identified by bioinformatics.  It is predicted to be used only by Chlorobiota (formerly Chlorobi), a phylum of bacteria.  The motif consists of two stem-loops that are followed by an apparent rho-independent transcription terminator.  The motif is presumed to function as an independently transcribed non-coding RNA.

A number of other RNAs were identified in the same study, including:
Bacteroidales-1 RNA motif
CrcB RNA Motif
Gut-1 RNA motif
JUMPstart RNA motif
Lactis-plasmid RNA motif
Lacto-usp RNA motif
MraW RNA motif
Ocean-V RNA motif
PsaA RNA motif
Pseudomon-Rho RNA motif
Rne-II RNA motif

References

External links
 

Non-coding RNA